The Japan national football team in 2013, managed by head coach Alberto Zaccheroni, competed in the 2013 FIFA Confederations Cup, the 2013 EAFF East Asian Cup and the fourth round of the 2014 FIFA World Cup qualification, in amongst international friendly matches both at home and abroad, as they progress towards the 2014 FIFA World Cup.

Record

Kits

Schedule
International Friendly (Kirin Challenge Cup 2013)

International Friendly

2014 FIFA World Cup qualification (AFC) Fourth Round

International Friendly (Kirin Challenge Cup 2013)

2014 FIFA World Cup qualification (AFC) Fourth Round

2014 FIFA World Cup qualification (AFC) Fourth Round

2013 FIFA Confederations Cup

2013 FIFA Confederations Cup

2013 FIFA Confederations Cup

2013 EAFF East Asian Cup

2013 EAFF East Asian Cup

2013 EAFF East Asian Cup

International Friendly (Kirin Challenge Cup 2013)

International Friendly (Kirin Challenge Cup 2013)

International Friendly (Kirin Challenge Cup 2013)

International Friendly

International Friendly

International Friendly

International Friendly

Players statistics

Goalscorers

References

External links
Japan Football Association

Japan national football team results
2013 in Japanese football
Japan